Pablo Antón Marín Estrada (born 1966 in Sama, Langreo) is a Spanish writer in Asturian.

He studied philology and he is member of several organisations to promote the Asturian language. He founded the literary association El sombreru de Virxilio. He lives in  Gijón.

Works
Blues del llaberintu (1989)
Les hores (1990)
Xente d'esti mundu y del otru (1992)
Esa lluz que nadie nun mata (1995)
Agua que pasa (1995)
Un tiempu meyor (1996)
La ciudá encarnada (1997)
Nubes negres (1998)
 Otra edá (2000)
 Los baños del Tévere (2003)
 Animal estrañu (2010)
 Despidida 2011 (2011)

Prizes
Abril de narrativa para jóvenes(2000), he was the first Spaniard who wan a national prize with a novel written entirely in Asturian.

External links
 El poder de la palabra
 Biografía

1966 births
Living people
People from Langreo
Writers from Asturias
Asturian language